Hail the Villain was a Canadian hard rock band from Oshawa, Ontario. The band had moderate success, and after the departure of lead vocalist Bryan Crouch, eventually went on an indefinite hiatus.

History

Early days and Population: Declining (2003–2011)
Hail the Villain hails from Oshawa, Ontario. Originally called Fahrenheit, the band formed in 2003, but changed their name to Hail the Villain in 2006. In the spring of 2009, Hail the Villain made a record deal with Warner Music Canada. By the spring of 2010, Roadrunner Records had come on board to release the album in the United States. Hail the Villain's debut album Population: Declining, was released sometime in 2008 and re-released on Roadrunner Records on June 8, 2010. The debut album was mixed by Mike Fraser. On August 17, 2010, Hail The Villain began playing on the Jägermeister stage at the Rockstar Energy Drink Uproar Festival tour. The band also played on the  Jose Cuervo Second Stage at The Kansas City Rockfest, on the grounds of the Liberty Memorial on May 14, 2011. Starting on November 21, "Runaway" was used as the theme song for WWE's 2010 Survivor Series. The single "Take Back the Fear" was in the 2010 WWE-produced sports drama film Legendary and the 2011 film Win Win. In 2011, Population: Declining was nominated for Rock Album of the Year at the 2011 Juno Awards.

They have released a music video for the song "My Reward", and they were on the 2011 MMVA: The Preview show.

Departure of Bryan Crouch, hiatus, other projects and possible break-up (2011–present)
On November 11, 2011, Hail the Villain announced that after seven years with the band, Bryan Crouch had quit and formed Six Side Die, which has released an E.P titled "My Enemy" in 2012, followed by a full length album called "That F'n Album" in 2013 and a song called "Schadenfreude" (that totals 21:12 in length), in 2017  .

On February 8, 2012, Hail the Villain released a post on their Twitter and Facebook pages, stating, "We're not dead. We're writing. Stay tuned." Shortly thereafter, lead guitarist Joseph Stamp recorded the song Stuck in a Rut with a band called Orange Blossom Special and the track was released on Soundcloud. Since then, the band's social media accounts have been inactive, leaving their status unknown. 

As of February 17, 2016, their website is not accessible, which likely means the band dissolved. 

Bryan Crouch formed an acoustic guitar rock duo with Corey Mole called The Nicky Nines; together they released a self titled 7 song album in October 2018. 

On November 25th 2019, Bryan Crouch announced his selection as the lead singer for a new band called Bonds of Mara.

Band members
Current lineup
Joseph Stamp - lead guitar (2003–2012)
Chad Richardson - bass guitar (2003–2012)
Flavio Cirillo - drums (2009-2012)

Former members
Bryan Crouch - vocals (2003–2011)
Drew Dockrill - drums

Discography

Studio albums

Population: Declining

 "Take Back the Fear" - 3:44
 "My Reward" - 2:53
 "Runaway" - 3:11
 "16 Cradles" - 3:42
 "Evil Has a Name" - 3:26
 "Try Hating the World" - 3:06
 "Glad to Be" - 2:58
 "Blackout" - 3:19
 "Pyro" - 2:21
 "Mission Control" - 3:32
 "Swan Dive Suicide" - 5:00
 "Social Graces" - 3:54

EPs
Maintain Radio Silence (April 17, 2010)
 "Social Graces" - 3:54
 "16 Cradles" - 3:42
 "Blackout" - 3:19
 "Take Back the Fear (Live)" -
 "Mission Control (Live)" -

Singles

Music videos
"Take Back the Fear" (One performance video and one animated video)
"Runaway" (Released October 20, 2010)
"My Reward" (Released May 20, 2011)

Multimedia
Hail the Villain created two volumes of a comic book series featuring the band, with each released volume named after a song. Volume 1: Take Back The Fear was released August 31, 2010, with Volume 2: My Reward'' releasing January 18, 2011. A third volume was planned, but has not been released due to the band's indefinite hiatus. Both released volumes can be read as webcomics on the Rune Entertainment website.

References

External links
Hail the Villain Official Website
Hail the Villain, 'Population: Declining' -- New Album - Noisecreep

Canadian hard rock musical groups
Musical groups established in 2003
Musical groups from Oshawa
2003 establishments in Ontario